Robert Dale Dykstra (May 31, 1922 – November 18, 1994) was a professional American basketball player. He played in the National Basketball League for the Detroit Gems early in the 1946–47 season before being sold to the Sheboygan Red Skins for the remainder of the season. Dykstra then played the 1947–48 year with Sheboygan as well, and for his NBL career he averaged 1.9 points per game.

References 

1922 births
1994 deaths
American men's basketball players
Basketball players from Iowa
Centers (basketball)
Detroit Gems players
People from Oskaloosa, Iowa
Sheboygan Red Skins players
Simpson Storm men's basketball players
Sportspeople from Rockford, Illinois